Fernando Niño Bejarano (born 16 September 1974) is a Spanish retired footballer who played as a central defender.

Club career
Niño was born in Rota, Andalusia. After beginning professionally with lowly hometown side CD Rota, he moved to neighbouring Xerez CD for the 1996–97 season, achieving promotion to the second division in his first year but being immediately relegated.

However, Niño's individual performances caught the attention of RCD Mallorca in La Liga and, however mainly registered with the Balearic Islands club's reserves, he finished his first year with 21 first-team appearances.

Subsequently, Niño became an undisputed starter, partnering Spain international Miguel Ángel Nadal during six full seasons. On 29 January 2003, he was one of three players on target for the hosts in a 4–0 home win against Real Madrid in the quarter-finals of the Copa del Rey (5–1 on aggregate), which ended in conquest.

In January 2006, after a serious injury had cut his 2004–05 campaign short, Niño left the team and joined second-tier Elche CF. His injury woes were recurrent in 2008–09, as he was forced to miss 18 league games. He retired from football with immediate effect at the season's end, aged almost 35, amassing professional totals of 264 matches and nine goals.

Personal life
Niño's son, also named Fernando, is also a footballer.

Honours
Mallorca
Copa del Rey: 2002–03
Supercopa de España: 1998
UEFA Cup Winners' Cup runner-up: 1998–99

References

External links

1974 births
Living people
People from Rota, Andalusia
Sportspeople from the Province of Cádiz
Spanish footballers
Footballers from Andalusia
Association football defenders
La Liga players
Segunda División players
Segunda División B players
Xerez CD footballers
RCD Mallorca players
Elche CF players